Fernando Ariel Troyansky (born 24 November 1977 in Bahía Blanca) is a former Argentine footballer who played as a defender.

Career
Troyansky started his career with his local team Club Olimpo in 1995, playing for five years in Torneo Argentino A and Primera B Nacional leagues. In 2000, he moved to Club Atlético Los Andes of the Primera Division Argentina and in 2001 he went to Austria to join the Austria Vienna. In 2009, he moved to the FC Kärnten where he regained the opportunity of being in a team's start line-up.

After one unsuccessful season back in Austria Vienna, he moved to SC Wiener Neustadt, facing the challenge to avoid relegation from the Austrian Football Bundesliga.

Troyansky retired at the end of the 2013 season.

Honours
Austria Wien
 Austrian Football Bundesliga: 2005–06
 Austrian Cup: 2004–05, 2005–06, 2006–07, 2008–09

External links
 Guardian statistics
 Argentine Primera statistics  
 Player Stats 
 Fernando Troyanski Austrian profile 
 Guardian football stats

Argentine footballers
Argentine people of Polish descent
Association football defenders
Olimpo footballers
Club Atlético Los Andes footballers
FK Austria Wien players
FC Admira Wacker Mödling players
SK Austria Kärnten players
Sportspeople from Bahía Blanca
1977 births
Living people